The FTSE World Government Bond Index (WGBI) is a market capitalization weighted bond index consisting of the government bond markets of the multiple countries. Country eligibility is determined based upon market capitalization and investability criteria. The index includes all fixed-rate bonds with a remaining maturity of one year or longer and with amounts outstanding of at least the equivalent of US$25 million. Government securities typically exclude floating or variable rate bonds, US/Canadian savings bonds and private placements. It is not possible to invest directly in such an index.

On August 31, 2017 London Stock Exchange Group (“LSEG”) completed the acquisition of The Yield Book and Citi Fixed Income Indices businesses from Citi. The name has been changed from the Salomon Smith Barney World Government Bond Index, to the Citigroup World Government Bond Index and now the FTSE World Government Bond Index.

Countries included
Countries in the index include:
Australia
Austria
Belgium
Canada
China
Denmark
Finland
France
Germany
Ireland
Israel
Italy
Japan
Malaysia
Mexico
Netherlands
Portugal
Singapore
South Africa
Spain
Sweden
Switzerland
United Kingdom
United States

See also
Bond market index
Government bond
List of bond market indices

References

External links
 Citi World Government Bond Index (WGBI)

Government bond indices